Dhanraj Tamang is a Bengali language action drama film directed by Pijush Bose. This film was released on 29 September 1978 in the banner of Usha Films. The story was written by Jorasandha. The film starring Uttam Kumar in name lead with Sandha Roy, Anil Chatterjee, Utpal Dutta, Chaya Devi. Music direction was done by Shyamal Mitra. The film produced by Ashim Sarkar who worked with Uttam before Sabyasachi 1977, Sanyashi Raja 1975. The film became hit at the box office.

Plot
Dhanraj Tamang is a popular an honest labour in a tea estate near Darjeeling. He always helps and supports local people. He also protects women from sexual abuser but can not save his own wife. His wife is raped by his boss of tea-estate and send him prison in a false allegation. Dhanraj returns for taking revenge.

Cast
 Uttam Kumar as Dhanraj Tamang
 Chhaya Devi
 Anil Chatterjee
 Sandhya Roy
 Utpal Dutt
 Dilip Roy
 Anup Kumar
 Shambhu Bhattacharya

Soundtrack

Reception
The film is the same banner and director where Uttam Kumar worked before Sanyashi Raja in 1975 and Sabyasachi in 1977. This film was release in 1978 Durga Puja occasion and become superhit and only success after a year of Uttam. His performance as Dhanraj become huge acclaimed by the critics and audiences.

Award
Filmfare East Awards
1979: Filmfare East Awards - Best Actor - Uttam Kumar.

References

External links
 

1978 films
Bengali-language Indian films
1970s action drama films
Indian action drama films
Films based on Indian novels
1970s Bengali-language films
1978 drama films
Films scored by Shyamal Mitra